Korisapadu  is a village in Bapatla district of the Indian state of Andhra Pradesh. It is the mandal headquarters of Korisapadu mandal in Chirala revenue division.

References 

Villages in Prakasam district
Mandal headquarters in Prakasam district